Gabriel González (born May 24, 1972) is a former Major League Baseball pitcher who played for one season. He pitched for the Florida Marlins for three games during the 1998 Florida Marlins season.

External links

1972 births
Living people
Major League Baseball pitchers
Baseball players from California
Florida Marlins players
Charlotte Knights players
Long Beach State Dirtbags baseball players
Long Beach Breakers players
People from Long Beach, California
Brevard County Manatees players
Calgary Cannons players
Harrisburg Senators players
Kane County Cougars players
Mobile BayBears players
Ottawa Lynx players
Portland Beavers players
Portland Sea Dogs players
American expatriate baseball players in Canada